Dragon's Fire is a science fiction novel by the American-Irish author Anne McCaffrey and her son Todd McCaffrey, Published in 2006, it was the twentieth book in the Dragonriders of Pern series that she initiated in 1967.

Dragon's Fire may be considered the second of a trilogy by the McCaffreys, between Dragon's Kin and Dragon Harper. Primarily the three books feature Kindan as a boy and young man, about 500 years after landing on Pern (500 AL). He is not the protagonist of Dragon's Fire, however, which is told from the viewpoints of three others in his generation, Cristov, Pellar, and Halla.

Plot summary

Pellar's story provides background information related to the previous title Dragon's Kin.  Cristov's story is mostly new material (blue firestone that survives in water) and takes place after the events in Pellar's. The focus of Cristov's story is the problem-laden transition from firestone to the phosphine-bearing rock that is used by later generations of dragons.

Notes

References

External links

2006 novels
2006 fantasy novels
2006 science fiction novels
Dragonriders of Pern books
Collaborative novels
Novels by Anne McCaffrey
Novels by Todd McCaffrey
Del Rey books